The enzyme mannosyl-3-phosphoglycerate phosphatase (EC 3.1.3.70) catalyzes the reaction 

2-O-(α-D-mannosyl)-3-phosphoglycerate + H2O = 2-O-(α-D-mannosyl)-D-glycerate + phosphate

This enzyme belongs to the family of hydrolases, specifically those acting on phosphoric monoester bonds.  The systematic name is 2-O-(α-D-mannosyl)-3-phosphoglycerate phosphohydrolase.

Structural studies

References

EC 3.1.3
Enzymes of known structure